James Unger may refer to:

 J. Marshall Unger (born 1947), professor of Japanese
 James Glenwright Unger (born 1985), American hockey player
 James J. Unger (1942–2008), coach, teacher and theorist of intercollegiate policy debate
 Jim Unger (1937–2012), British-born Canadian cartoonist